Two ships of the United States Navy have been named Belknap, in honor of Rear Admiral George Eugene Belknap.

 , was a destroyer launched in 1919 and decommissioned in 1945.
 , the lead ship of her class, was a guided missile cruiser in service from 1964 to 1995.

Sources

United States Navy ship names